Suutari  is a Finnish occupational surname meaning "shoemaker", via German, ultimately from Latin: sutor. Notable people with the surname include:

Sirpa Suutari, Finnish professional ballroom dancer
Eero Suutari, member of the 36th Parliament of Finland

Occupational surnames
Finnish-language surnames